John Gunter (29 August 1883 – 23 January 1963) was a former Australian rules footballer who played with Carlton in the Victorian Football League (VFL).

Notes

External links 
		
John Gunter's profile at Blueseum

Carlton Football Club players
1883 births
1963 deaths